Ratanjit Pratap Narain Singh or R. P. N. Singh (born 25 April 1964), is an Indian politician and former Minister of State in the Ministry of Home Affairs. He was the Member of Parliament for Kushinagar constituency in the fifteenth Lok Sabha from 2009 to 2014. In the 2014 General Election, despite an increase in his own votes, he was defeated by Rajesh Pandey (BJP). He lost again in 2019. In September 2020, Singh was chosen for AICC in charge of Jharkhand and Chhattisgarh.

He resigned from Congress in January 2022 and joined the BJP, a month ahead of 2022 UP Elections, thus becoming the fourth prominent Doon School alumnus to leave the Congress Party to join hands with the BJP, following Jyotiraditya Scindia, Jitin Prasada and Amarinder Singh.

Personal life
R.P.N. Singh hails from a Sainthwar royal family of Kushinagar (Padrauna), Uttar Pradesh and is a Sainthwar  leader from eastern Uttar Pradesh. He comes from a royal family of Padrauna. He attended The Doon School, an institution which has had historic links with Congress since the Rajiv Gandhi 'Doon Cabinet' era, and given Rahul Gandhi's own schooling at Doon. From 2014 to 2018, he served as the president of Doon's alumni body The Doon School Old Boys' Society.

He was married on 7 December 2002 to Sonia Singh (nee Sonia Singh, anchor and editorial director at NDTV), and has three daughters. He currently resides in the Palace, Padrauna, Kushinagar, Uttar Pradesh, India. His father, Late C.P.N. Singh, was also MP of Kushinagar (then Hata) and a Minister of State for Defence in the Indira Gandhi cabinet in 1980.

R.P.N. Singh was elected MLA from the seat of Padrauna in 1996, 2002, and 2007. In 2009 he was elected to the Lok Sabha. He lost the Lok Sabha election from the Kushinagar seat in 2014 and 2019.

Positions held 

 M.L.A. (Uttar Pradesh), 1996-2009
 President, Uttar Pradesh Youth Congress, 1997-1999
 Secretary, AICC, 2003-2006
 Elected to the 15th Lok Sabha from the Padrauna constituency, 2009
 Union Minister of State, Road, Transport and Highways, 2009-2011
 Union Minister of State, Petroleum and Natural Gas and Corporate Affairs, 2011-2013
 Union Minister of state for Home Affairs 2013-2014
 President, The Doon School Old Boys' Society, 2014–2016

References

External links
Official Twitter

1964 births
Living people
Members of the Cabinet of India
The Doon School alumni
People from Kushinagar district
India MPs 2009–2014
Uttar Pradesh MLAs 1997–2002
Uttar Pradesh MLAs 2007–2012
Lok Sabha members from Uttar Pradesh
United Progressive Alliance candidates in the 2014 Indian general election
Bharatiya Janata Party politicians from Uttar Pradesh